George V. Elmore (1880 – 1 July 1916) was an English professional footballer who played in the Football League for Glossop, Blackpool and West Bromwich Albion as a forward. He also played in the Scottish League for St Mirren and Partick Thistle and is regarded as Altrincham's 'first star player'.

Personal life 
Elmore worked in the salt trade in Northwich. In September 1914, one month after Britain's entry into the First World War, he enlisted in the Royal Scots. Elmore was deployed on the Western Front in January 1916 and was serving as a lance corporal when he was killed in Sausage Valley on the first day of the Somme. He is commemorated on the Thiepval Memorial.

Honours 
Witton Albion
 Cheshire Senior Cup: 1901–02
 Crewe & District Cup: 1900–01
Altrincham
 Manchester League: 1904–05, 1906–07
 Cheshire Senior Cup: 1904–05

Career statistics

References

1880 births
English footballers
English Football League players
British Army personnel of World War I
Royal Scots soldiers
British military personnel killed in the Battle of the Somme
1916 deaths
Northwich Victoria F.C. players
West Bromwich Albion F.C. players
Bristol Rovers F.C. players
Southern Football League players
Sportspeople from Northwich
Witton Albion F.C. players
Altrincham F.C. players
Glossop North End A.F.C. players
Blackpool F.C. players
Partick Thistle F.C. players
Scottish Football League players
St Mirren F.C. players
St Bernard's F.C. players
Broxburn United F.C. wartime guest players
Association football forwards
Burton United F.C. players
Manchester United F.C. players
Military personnel from Cheshire